Briis-sous-Forges (literally Briis under Forges) is a commune in the Essonne department and Île-de-France region of north-central France.

The inhabitants of Briis-sous-Forges are known in French as les Briissois.

See also
Communes of the Essonne department

References

External links

Official website 

Mayors of Essonne Association 

Communes of Essonne